Grevillea paradoxa, commonly known as the bottlebrush grevillea,<ref name=FB>{{FloraBase|name=Grevillea paradoxa|id=2057}}</ref> is a species of flowering plant in the family Proteaceae and is endemic to the south-west of Western Australia. It is an erect to spreading, prickly shrub with pinnatipartite leaves, the lobes linear, widely spreading and sharply pointed, and with cylindrical clusters of pale to dark pink or cream-coloured flowers with a pinkish-red style.

TaxonomyGrevillea paradoxa was first formally described in 1868 by Ferdinand von Mueller in Fragmenta Phytographiae Australiae from specimens collected by James Drummond. The specific epithet (paradoxa) means "unexpected, strange or marvellous", because von Mueller thought the plant looked Hakea-like.

Distribution and habitat
Bottlebrush grevillea grows in mallee scrub and shrubland and is widespread between Mullewa, Wubin, Kondinin Kalgoorlie and the Die Hardy Range in the Avon Wheatbelt, Coolgardie, Geraldton Sandplains, Mallee, Murchison and Yalgoo bioregions of south-western Western Australia.

Conservation status
This grevillea is listed as "not threatened", by the Western Australian Government Department of Biodiversity, Conservation and Attractions.

Use in horticulture
The popular garden plant, Grevillea 'Dorothy Gordon', is a hybrid between G. sessilis and G. paradoxa''.

See also
 List of Grevillea species

References

paradoxa
Endemic flora of Western Australia
Eudicots of Western Australia
Proteales of Australia
Taxa named by Ferdinand von Mueller